Cleveland Green is a former offensive tackle who played eight seasons in the National Football League for the Miami Dolphins. He started in Super Bowl XIX.

1957 births
Living people
People from Bolton, Mississippi
American football offensive linemen
Miami Dolphins players
Southern Jaguars football players
African-American players of American football
Players of American football from Mississippi
21st-century African-American people
20th-century African-American sportspeople